is a railway station in Nishi-ku, Nagoya, Aichi Prefecture, Japan.

The station is named after the nearby Shōnai Greens.

Lines

 (Station number: T02)

Layout

Platforms

See also
 Shōnai River

References

External links
 
 Shōnai Ryokuchi Park 

Railway stations in Japan opened in 1984
Railway stations in Aichi Prefecture